Tobi Bakre (born 1 June 1994) is a Nigerian actor, model, host, compere, and photographer. Tobi rose to fame after finishing up as a finalist in the Big Brother Naija (season 3) reality TV show in 2018.

Early life and education 
Tobi was born into the family of four children, among which include his older brother, Femi Bakre, CEO of Kraks TV and 
two sisters. He earned his Bachelor's degree at the University of Lagos where he graduated with a Second Class Honours Upper Division in Banking and Finance.

Career 
Tobi used to be an investment banker having worked in the office of the Accountant General of the Federation and in the banking industry for four years. He participated in the Big Brother Naija (season 3) reality TV show.
He's  brand ambassador to Unilever, Amstel Malta, and Jumia in and out of Nigeria.

Filmography

Film

Television

Awards and nominations

See also
 List of Nigerian actors

References

External links
 

1994 births
Living people
21st-century Nigerian male actors
Male actors in Yoruba cinema
University of Lagos alumni
Male actors from Lagos
Nigerian male film actors
Nigerian male television actors
Yoruba male actors
Yoruba male models
Models from Lagos
Participants in Nigerian reality television series
Nigerian male models
Big Brother (franchise) contestants
Nigerian photographers
Nigerian television personalities
Nigerian television presenters